William Haymond may refer to:

Major William Haymond (1740–1821), US soldier and civil servant who served in the American Revolutionary War
William S. Haymond (1823–1885), US representative from Indiana